The Calipt'Air Walabis Bi is a Swiss two-place, paraglider that was designed and produced by Calipt'Air of Spiez. It is now out of production.

Design and development
The Walabis Bi was designed as a tandem glider for flight training. The Bi designation indicates "bi-place" or two seater. It shares a common design heritage with the Sky Paragiders Golem.

The glider is AFNOR Biplace certified.

Operational history
Reviewer Noel Bertrand noted in a 2003 review that the Walabis Bi had become a noted popular choice of wings for professional pilots giving tandem rides.

Specifications (Walabis Bi)

References

Walabis Bi
Paragliders